Over the years, many people have called for language reform of the English language. Various types of reforms have been proposed.

Spelling reforms

Spelling reforms are attempts to regularise English spelling, whether by enforcing a regular set of rules, or by replacing the basic English alphabet with a new one. English spelling reforms include:

Using the basic English alphabet:
Cut Spelling
Parallel English
Handbook of Simplified Spelling
SoundSpel
Spelling Reform step 1 (SR1)
SaypU (Spell As You Pronounce Universally)
Simpel-Fonetik method of writing
Traditional Spelling Revised

Extending or replacing the basic English alphabet:
Benjamin Franklin's phonetic alphabet
Deseret alphabet
Initial Teaching Alphabet
Interspel
Romic alphabet
Shavian alphabet (revised version: Quikscript)
Unifon
Inglish

Subsets
Subsets are reforms that use a restricted wordlist and grammar. English subsets include:
Attempto Controlled English
Basic English
E-Prime
Globish
Plain English
Simplified English
Special English
Specialised English

Vocabulary reforms
Vocabulary reforms seek to reform English by changing or restricting its words without changing its grammar.
Anglish: the use of native (Germanic) words only, and spellings of such without foreign influence—a form of linguistic purism

External links
 Language Romanisation and Re-Romanisation

English language
Linguistics lists